Pedro Ponce de León (died 1314) was a Spanish nobleman, lord of Pueblo de Asturias, Cangas and Tineo.

He was son of Fernán Pérez Ponce de León, and a great-grandson of King Alfonso IX of León

He was Adelantado (governor) of the Andalusian frontier and Galicia, and Mayordomo mayor (high steward} to King Ferdinand IV of Castile.

Sources

Lords of Spain
1314 deaths
14th-century Castilians